The Midwest Hockey League (MWHL) was a short-lived proposed low level minor pro hockey league that was scheduled to begin play in the 2009-2010 season. The league administrative office was located in Fort Wayne, Indiana.

League History
On August 10, 2009, the MWHL announced a merger with the All American Hockey League, absorbing the MWHL's Madison Ice Muskies as well as key MWHL personnel. The merged leagues operate under the AAHL name.

2009–10 teams
The league was in the process of determining teams for the 2009–2010 season when the merger took place.

Teams Year by Year

References

External links
 Official MWHL website

Defunct ice hockey leagues in the United States
2009–10 in American ice hockey by league